Victory Air Transport is an airline based in Fort Lauderdale, Florida, US It operates VIP charters.

History 
The airline had its application approved by the US Department of Transportation on 23 July 2003.

Fleet 
As of August 2019, the Victory Air Transport fleet includes:

See also

References

External links 
 Victory Air Transport

Charter airlines of the United States
Companies based in Fort Lauderdale, Florida
Airlines based in Florida
Airlines established in 2003